Prefab 05 Modelu was a Romanian professional football club from Modelu, Călărași County, founded in 2005 and dissolved in 2008.

The club played for two and a half seasons in the Liga II, between 2006 and 2008, but the lack of results forced its owner to dissolve it.

Notable players
 Dumitru Hotoboc
 Vasile Olariu
 Alin Șeroni
 Dinu Sănmărtean

References

Association football clubs established in 2005
Association football clubs disestablished in 2008
Defunct football clubs in Romania
Liga II clubs
2005 establishments in Romania
2008 disestablishments in Romania